The Rhenopteridae are a family of eurypterids, an extinct group of chelicerate arthropods commonly known as "sea scorpions". The family is the only family currently contained in the superfamily Rhenopteroidea, one of four superfamilies classified as part of the suborder Stylonurina.

The family contains one of the earliest known eurypterids, Brachyopterus, known from the Middle Ordovician (also the sister taxon to all other rhenopterids), and is the most primitive clade of stylonurine eurypterids. The last known members of the family went extinct during the Early Devonian.

Description 

Rhenopterids were small, characterized by scattered tubercules and knobs on the outer surface of the exoskeleton. Their first two (or possibly three) pairs of walking legs had spines; the last two pairs were long and powerful, without spines. The prosoma (head) was subtrapezoidal, with arcuate compound eyes on parallel axes.  The male genital appendages were short with two distal spines.

The rhenopterids were the most primitive stylonurines and the family encompasses many previously enigmatic eurypterids, such as Brachyopterus, Kiareopterus and Rhenopterus itself, all united by a rounded posterior margin to the metastoma and prosomal appendage III bearing single fixed spines.

Unlike the derived stylonurines of the family Stylonuridae and superfamily Hibbertopteroidea, rhenopterids retained primitive Hughmilleria-type prosomal appendages II-IV, which are unsuited to sweep-feeding. The family is thus more likely to have adopted a scavenging lifestyle.

Evolutionary history 

The Rhenopterids first appeared during the Middle Ordovician as one of the earliest and most basal groups of Stylonurine eurypterids. Clear evolutionary trends can be observed in the carapaces of the rhenopterids. Basal rhenopterids possess broad carapaces narrowest at their base (as in Brachyopterus and Brachyopterella) whilst more derived rhenopterids have broad carapaces narrowest at the front and the most derived members possess narrower carapaces narrowest at the front (as in Rhenopterus). Kiaeropterus is unusual in its morphology and might represent a Silurian offshoot.

Systematics and genera 
The Rhenopteroids are diagnosed as being stylonurines with the posterior margin of the metastomate being round. Rhenopterids are in turn rhenopteroids with single fixed spines on the prosomal appendage III and possess a short telson. The Appendages II-IV have short and fixed spines and V-VI are nonspiniferous. Since no currently known rhenopteroid challenge the diagnosis applied to the Rhenopteridae, all rhenopteroids are rhenopterids.

Lamsdell, Braddy and Tetlie (2010) assigned one subfamily to the family, the Rhenopterinae, including the genera Alkenopterus and Rhenopterus. The Rhenopterinae was restricted to the Early to Middle Devonian and were diagnosed as being rhenopterids with a non-spiniferous appendage IV and a caudal postabdomen. More recently, Alkenopterus has been reclassified as a member of the Onychopterellidae within the Eurypterina, making the subfamily defunct.

Superfamily Rhenopteroidea Størmer, 1951
 Family Rhenopteridae Størmer, 1951
 Brachyopterella Kjellesvig-Waering, 1966
 Brachyopterus Størmer, 1951
 Kiaeropterus Waterston, 1979
 Leiopterella Lamsdell, Braddy, Loeffler, & Dineley, 2010
 Rhenopterus Størmer, 1936

References

 
Early Devonian extinctions
Middle Ordovician first appearances
Prehistoric arthropod families